Paul Curteanu (born 27 July 1983 in Craiova) is a Romanian football player, currently under contract with FC Drobeta.

See also
Football in Romania
List of football clubs in Romania

References

External links
 

1983 births
Living people
Romanian footballers
FC U Craiova 1948 players
Association football defenders
Sportspeople from Craiova